Liquan South railway station is a railway station in Liquan County, Xianyang, Shaanxi, China. It is an intermediate stop on the Yinchuan–Xi'an high-speed railway and was opened with the line on 26 December 2020.

Immediately to the east of this station, there is a spur allowing trains to join the Xi'an–Pingliang railway.

See also
Liquan railway station

References 

Railway stations in Shaanxi
Railway stations in China opened in 2020